Raft River Jr/Sr High School is located in Malta, Idaho and teaches grades 7–12. The first school building was built in 1883 and had around 25 students. A brick building was built in 1902. The high school moved to a new facility in 1955. The current enrollment is 149.

References

Schools in Cassia County, Idaho
Public middle schools in Idaho
Public high schools in Idaho